Rubrobacter calidifluminis is a thermophilic and strictly aerobic bacterium from the genus of Rubrobacter which has been isolated from the São Miguel Island in the Azores.

References

 

Rubrobacterales
Bacteria described in 2014